Karlgeorg Schuster (19 August 1886-16 June 1973) was an Admiral with the Kriegsmarine during World War II. 

He was born on 19 August 1886 at Uelzen, Germany. Schuster joined the Imperial Navy on the 1 April 1905, as a sea cadet. He died on 16 June 1977 at Kitzeberg bei Kiel, Germany.

References
Hans H. Hildebrand und Ernest Henriot: Deutschlands Admirale 1849-1945, Band 3: P-Z (Packroß bis Zuckschwerdt), Osnabrück 1990, pp. 313–315.

1886 births
1973 deaths
Admirals of the Kriegsmarine
German prisoners of war in World War II held by the United States